Martinsburg Township is located in Pike County, Illinois. As of the 2010 census, its population was 419 and it contained 186 housing units.

Geography

Demographics

References

External links
City-data.com
Illinois State Archives

Townships in Pike County, Illinois
Townships in Illinois